Sonja Landweer (20 April 1933 – 15 December 2019) was a Dutch artist and ceramist, who lived and worked in Ireland, known for her bronze castings, unique patinations and subtle forms.

Life and work 
Landweer was born in Amsterdam, the eldest child of three to German artist and teacher, Erna Benter-Landweer and Dutch registrar of births and deaths, Pieter Landweer. She studied ceramics at the Gerrit Rietveld Academie in the early 1950s, and started her own art studio in 1954.

In 1962 she took part in exhibition of six young ceramists from Amsterdam in Museum Boijmans Van Beuningen, together with Hans de Jong, Jan de Rooden, Johan van Loon, Jan van der Vaart and Johnny Rolf, which signified the rebirth of artisan ceramics in the Netherlands. In 1965 she was invited to move to Ireland to revitalise Irish craft and design as part of a group of international artists, where she met Barrie Cooke with whom she had one child called Aoine in 1966. She was artist in residence at the Kilkenny Design Workshops and teacher. There she came into contact with Lance Clark of C. & J. Clark, and inspired him to develop his Desert Trek shoe design. In 1981 she jointed Aosdána and kept drawing, painting, print-making, making jewellery and pottery.

Landweer was awarded the Verzetsprijs in Holland in 1964; the prix artistique at the Biennale Internationale de Ceramique d’Art, Vallauris, France in 1974 and the 1992 honorary award from NCAD.

Work in public collections 
The work of Landweer is held in several public collections worldwide, a selection:
 Frans Hals Museum, Haarlem
 Princessehof Ceramics Museum
 Hildesheim Stadtisches Museum, Germany
 Museum of Decorative Arts, Copenhagen
 Ulster Museum

References

Further reading 
 Danske Kunstindustrimuseum (København). Sonja Landweer: keramik, 1972.
 Mieke G. Spruit-Ledeboer, Sonja Landweer. Transforming Clay: Sonja Landweer, 2009. * Nicola Gordon Brown, Susan Holland, Emma Lucy O'Brien. Life's Work: Sonja Landweer : a Retrospective Exhibition, 2011.

External links 

 Sonja Landweer, Peppercanister Gallery, biography.
  Sonja Landweer, jewelry.

1933 births
Dutch women ceramists
Dutch people of German descent
Artists from Amsterdam
Gerrit Rietveld Academie alumni
Aosdána members
2019 deaths